Aphelodoris luctuosa is a species of sea slug, a dorid nudibranch, shell-less marine gastropod mollusks in the family Dorididae. It is endemic to New Zealand waters [source: NZOR. It has the following names as synonyms:  
 Aphelodoris affinis
 Aphelodoris cheesemani [unjustified replacement name]
 Aphelodoris purpurea
 Doris luctuosa [original combination (="basionym" in botany)]
It must not be confused with Aphelodoris luctuosa Bergh, 1905, which has been renamed Aphelodoris berghi Odhner, 1924, because of the homonymy.

References

External links 

Dorididae
Gastropods described in 1882